Priscilla Weems (born January 18, 1972) is an American-born actress and singer.

Weems started acting at an early age, and was on the first two seasons of Five Mile Creek. Later, she had a recurring role for five seasons as Claudia Shively, daughter of Mary Jo (Annie Potts), on Designing Women.  She also guest-starred on several shows, including Quantum Leap, The Garry Shandling Show and St. Elsewhere.

Weems left acting to get married and have a son. Her marriage ended in divorce and she later returned to the entertainment industry as a singer.

References

External links

1972 births
Living people
American film actresses
American television actresses
Actresses from Oregon
21st-century American singers
21st-century American actresses